Sabine Schmitz (14 May 1969 – 16 March 2021) was a German professional motor racing driver and television personality. Born in Adenau to a family in the hotel and catering business, and raised in one of the villages nestled within the Nürburgring race track, she initially trained to join the same profession as her parents, before choosing to begin a career in racing, working as a driver for BMW and Porsche.

She became known for being an expert on the Nürburgring circuit, winning two victories in endurance races during the course of her driving career on the circuit, and became a cult icon on television following her appearance on BBC's Top Gear, making recurring appearances alongside several of the programme's presenters. Schmitz died of cancer, in March 2021, at the age of 51, following a diagnosis in late 2017.

Career

Nürburgring
Following occasional drives with the family car on the Nordschleife, all three Schmitz sisters started racing, but only Sabine continued and went on to achieve several notable victories. Schmitz won in CHC and VLN race events, the VLN endurance racing championship in 1998. After getting married and running a hotel in Pulheim near Cologne, she won the 24 Hours Nürburgring in 1996 and 1997 as Sabine Reck, all with a BMW M3 Group N entered and co-driven by local veteran Johannes Scheid. In 2006 Schmitz and Klaus Abbelen drove the #97 Porsche 997 in the Nürburgring VLN endurance racing series, entered by Land Motorsport. They finished third in the 24h 2008.

Schmitz came to mass public attention driving one of the two BMW M5 "ring taxis" around the -long race track in an entertaining manner.

According to her own estimates, Schmitz went around the track more than 20,000 times, increasing by approximately 1,200 per year. Her familiarity with the circuit earned her the nicknames "Queen of the Nürburgring" and "the fastest taxi driver in the world". She said her favourite parts of the track were the Schwedenkreuz (Swedish Cross) and Fuchsröhre (Fox Hole).

Schmitz's company, Nürburgring-based Sabine Schmitz Motorsport, offers advanced driver training and a "ring taxi" service for passengers. Schmitz herself ceased driving the "ring taxi" in 2011.

Television career
As a result of her popularity as "the fastest taxi driver in the world", and her charisma, Schmitz became an occasional motorsport guest commentator, known for her gleefully dry descriptions of driving incidents. Since September 2006, Schmitz has co-hosted a motoring show on German television, D Motor on the DMAX TV channel. In each show, she takes on another challenge, for example Schmitz in a Ferrari 360 vs. a 1200 hp Race Truck, or Schmitz in a Formula Renault race car vs. a race sidecar. She has also appeared on Fifth Gear.

Her first appearance on British television was on the 2002 BBC programme Jeremy Clarkson: Meets the Neighbours, where she took Clarkson around the Nürburgring in the "ring taxi".

Top Gear
In December 2004, Schmitz gained further recognition in the United Kingdom after appearing in the BBC television programme Top Gear with presenter Jeremy Clarkson. After Clarkson (under her tutelage) set a lap time of 9 minutes 59 seconds around the Nürburgring in a Jaguar S-Type diesel (Series 5, Episode 5), she dismissed his best lap with the comment "I tell you something, I do that lap time in the van". She did a lap in the Jaguar S-Type, and set a time of 9 minutes 12 seconds, beating him by 47 seconds. When trying to film Schmitz as she drove the S-Type, the film crew were unable to keep up, and had to get Jaguar test driver Wolfgang Schubauer to drive the Jaguar S-Type R chase car. In a later episode Schmitz drove a Ford Transit diesel van in an attempt to beat Clarkson's time set in the Jaguar, missing his time by just 9 seconds (Series 6, Episode 7).

In 2008 Schmitz (and fellow D Motor presenters Carsten van Ryssen and Tim Schrick,) featured in a Top Gear challenge of "Top Gear Vs the Germans".  The Top Gear team faced off against the German team in a series of comedy-biased challenges in order to see which team was the best.  Schmitz took on Clarkson in a gymkhana-styled event followed by a single lap race, beating him by several seconds, although due to prolific cheating from the Top Gear team, the Germans lost overall.

In March 2015, The Guardian featured a satirical article calling for Schmitz to be the new presenter of Top Gear in order to gracefully cancel the programme, concluding that "She has appeared from time to time on Top Gear in the past, and shown herself to possess exactly the right mix of knowledge and boisterousness for the job every time. Plus, she is both German and a woman, a combination of traits so alien to the majority of Top Gear viewers that the whole programme would probably self-destruct within an hour of her taking the job. And surely, at this point, that would, as they say, be the best outcome for everyone involved."

In December 2015 The Daily Telegraph reported that Schmitz had been selected as a presenter on the revamped Top Gear. This was later confirmed by the BBC in February 2016, along with the announcement of several new presenters for the programme.

Personal life 
Born in Adenau to local restaurant owners, Schmitz and her two elder sisters grew up in the "Hotel am Tiergarten" (in the basement of which is the Pistenklause restaurant) in Nürburg within the Nürburgring Nordschleife.

Schmitz trained as a Hotelfachfrau (graduate in hotel and catering business) and sommelière.  During her marriage to a hotelier she lived in Pulheim, but after her divorce in 2000, up until 2003, she owned a bar-restaurant in Nürburg named the Fuchsröhre (Foxhole) after a track section. She was also a qualified helicopter pilot.

In July 2020, Schmitz revealed via a Facebook post that she had been suffering from "an extremely persistent cancer" since late 2017. She explained that she had sought treatment and her condition was improving, but she had relapsed and would be undergoing treatment again. At the time of her revelation, Schmitz was still making recurring appearances on Top Gear. She died of cancer at a hospital in Trier on 16 March 2021, aged 51. The Nürburgring have renamed the first corner of the Nordschleife loop as the "Sabine-Schmitz-Kurve" posthumously in her honour.

Race results

South African Touring Car Championship

Schmitz, competing under her married name of Sabine Reck, contested the 1995 AA Fleetcare Super Touring Championship, driving an E36 BMW super touring car for BMW SA Motorsport alongside teammates Deon Joubert and Shaun Van Der Linde.

Despite high expectations, Schmitz did not find success in the South African championship. She was consistently outqualified and outpaced by Joubert and Van Der Linde, both of whom had extensive experience of the race tracks on which the series was run. A mid-season crash involving Toyota driver Mike White at Killarney during an open practice session resulted in neck injuries and a damaged right knee, forcing her to sit out three consecutive race meetings.
At the end of the 1995 season, Schmitz finished last in the Class A points standings, with no race wins, pole positions or fastest laps. She did not return for the 1996 season.

24 Hours Nürburgring: Overall winner in 1996 and 1997 (BMW), third in 2008 (Porsche), ninth in 2011 (Porsche), sixth in 2012 (Porsche)

Complete World Touring Car Championship results
(key) (Races in bold indicate pole position) (Races in italics indicate fastest lap)

References

External links
 

Sabine Schmitz obituary in New York Times 
Sabine Schmitz obituary in Autoweek

Video footage
 Part 1, Part 2 One Lap with Ford Transit (diesel) in 10:08 at TopGear

1969 births
2021 deaths
24 Hours of Daytona drivers
Deaths from cancer in Germany
German female racing drivers
People from Adenau
Racing drivers from Rhineland-Palatinate
Top Gear people
WeatherTech SportsCar Championship drivers
World Touring Car Championship drivers
Nürburgring 24 Hours drivers